Cardiff City Football Club is a professional football club based in Cardiff, Wales. Founded in 1899, the club competed in local amateur leagues before turning professional in 1910, moving into the English football league system by joining the Southern Football League. Ten years later, they were elected into the Second Division of the Football League, winning promotion to the First Division in their first season. They achieved their highest ever position during the 1923–24 season, finishing in second place of the First Division but lost the league title on goal average to Huddersfield Town. They were relegated from the First Division in 1929. Since then, they have spent a further nine seasons in the top tier; the most recent return was a one-year spell in the 2018–19 season.

Cardiff's first team have competed in a number of nationally contested leagues, and their record against each club faced in those competitions is summarised below. The club's first competitive fixture as a professional team came against Ton Pentre on 24 September 1910, the opening day of the 1910–11 season, in the Second Division of the Southern Football League. Their first fixture in the Football League came on 28 August 1920 against Stockport County. They met their 116th and most recent different opponent, Burton Albion, for the first time on the opening day of the 2016–17 Football League season. The team that Cardiff have met the most in league competition is Preston North End; the 38 victories from 100 meetings is more than Cardiff have recorded against any other club. Millwall have drawn 28 league matches with Cardiff, more than any other club, and Bristol City have recorded the most victories against Cardiff with 38.

All statistics are correct up to and including the match played on 15 March 2023.

Key
The table includes results of matches played by Cardiff City in the Southern Football League, the Football League and the Premier League. Matches from uncompleted competitions – the abandoned 1939–40 Football League season  – are excluded, as are test matches, Football League play-offs, and matches in the various wartime competitions.
The name used for each opponent is the name they had when Cardiff City most recently played a league match against them. Results against each opponent include results against that club under any former name. For example, results against Leyton Orient include matches played against Orient (1966–1987) and Clapton Orient (before 1945).
The columns headed "First" and "Last" contain the first and most recent seasons in which Cardiff City played league matches against each opponent.
P = matches played; W = matches won; D = matches drawn; L = matches lost; Win% = percentage of total matches won
  Clubs with this background and symbol in the "Opponent" column are Cardiff City's divisional rivals in the current season, the 2022–23 EFL Championship.
  Clubs with this background and symbol in the "Opponent" column are defunct.

All-time league record

Footnotes

References
General
For 1910–11 to 2000–01: 
For 1920–21 to present day: 
For 2001–02 to present day: 

Specific

Legaue record by opponent
Association football league records by opponent